Escravos Airport  is an airport serving the Escravos coastal oil terminal in the Delta State of Nigeria.

The Osubi non-directional beacon (Ident: ESC) is located on the field. The runway length includes a  displaced threshold on Runway 31.

See also
Transport in Nigeria
List of airports in Nigeria

References

External links
OurAirports - Escravos
SkyVector - DNES
OpenStreetMap - Escravos

Airports in Nigeria